TARA (The Absolute Reference Audio) Labs is a manufacturer of high-end audio cables from Medford, Oregon. It is currently led by president Merrill Bergs. The trademark of Tara Labs is their use of solid wire.

History 

TARA Labs was established in 1984. As early as the mid-1970s and early 1980s, TARA Labs had experimented with solid core conductors of different diameters. It was hypothesized that an 'optimum diameter' of 18 AWG (American Wire Gage) or 1 millimeter was ideal for audio frequencies because there was minimal high-frequency attenuation caused by the principles known as the Skin Effect. Founders: Matthew Bond & Merrill Bergs work was corroborated by research work from the NBS or National Bureau of Standards in the 1930s and confirmed later by Stereophile in July 1988, in a table presented as the DC to AC resistance ratio versus frequency in wires of different diameters. TARA Labs is credited with the invention of solid-core wires for audio use because his work predates Dennis Morecroft (1984) and any of the early solid-core wires developed for use in audio in England at the time.

Their first commercial speaker cables were designed in 1984, the Phase II speaker cable, which was a solid core design. Later, in 1990, TARA Labs introduced the world’s first cable to have a floating conductor unterminated at one end that would allow for an increased high-frequency bandwidth to be coupled to the signal-carrying conductors (US patent No. 5033091). Later, a control device inside a box fitted to the cable (The Temporal Continuum) allowed the user to adjust the amount of high-frequency energy to be heard.

TARA Labs introduced Rectangular Solid Core cables in 1992. These cables employed solid core conductors with a rectangular cross-section and can be made in specific proportions(width and height). This affects the tuning of the frequency response of a conductor as compared to around a conductor of the same size or DC resistance.

The cables employed solid core conductors with a rectangular cross-section. Both the Gen2 conductor and the smaller Gen3 conductor are said to be Eight-Nines™ pure copper, which is 99.999999% pure. TARA Labs’ trademarks for this technology are 8N™ and SA-OF8N® (Super Annealed – Oxygen-Free 8 Nines copper). According to Bond, the term ‘annealing’ refers to the method whereby a conductor can be made softer and more conductive.

In 1999 Tara Labs introduced the "Zero" interconnect with a Vacuum Dielectric Insulation system.

In 2014, TARA Labs introduced a new line of high-end cables called The Evolution Series.

References

External links 
Tara Labs website
Stereophile Interview with TARA Labs, Dec. 1996

Audio equipment manufacturers of the United States
Companies based in Ashland, Oregon
1984 establishments in Oregon